Mount Heine is a hill,  high, in the northern part of White Island, in the Ross Archipelago, Antarctica. It was named by the New Zealand Geological Survey Antarctic Expedition (1958–59) for A.J. Heine, the leader of their party who visited White Island. Heine, who climbed this hill, spent four summers and one winter in Antarctica, mostly in the McMurdo Sound area.

References

Mountains of the Ross Dependency
White Island (Ross Archipelago)